Phiala wichgrafi is a moth in the family Eupterotidae. It was described by Strand in 1911. It is found in South Africa.

References

Endemic moths of South Africa
Moths described in 1911
Eupterotinae